Dajt is a village in the former municipality of Zall-Bastar in Tirana County, Albania. At the 2015 local government reform it became part of the municipality Tirana.

References

Populated places in Tirana
Villages in Tirana County